Barry John Skipper  was Vice Chairman for Norwich City and he joined the club in 1996.

Skipper held Sales and Marketing positions with Procter & Gamble, Mars and Cadbury Schweppes. and was chief executive of Booker's food distribution division. He was appointed CBE in the 1994 New Year Honours.

On 8 May 2007, Skipper stood down as Vice Chairman of Norwich after more than 10 years at the club.

References

Commanders of the Order of the British Empire
Norwich City F.C.
Year of birth missing (living people)
Living people